Ronystony Cordeiro (born 19 June 1980) is a Brazilian paralympic swimmer. He participated at the 2011 Parapan American Games and 2015 Parapan American Games, being awarded one gold medal, four silver medals and three bronze medals in the breaststroke, freestyle and medley events. Cordeiro also was awarded the gold medal at the 2013 World Championships in the men's 4 × 50 metre freestyle relay event. He participated at the 2012 Summer Paralympics, 2016 Summer Paralympics and 2020 Summer Paralympics in the swimming competition, winning no medal in all.

References

External links 
Paralympic Games profile

1980 births
Living people
Place of birth missing (living people)
Brazilian male breaststroke swimmers
Brazilian male freestyle swimmers
Brazilian male medley swimmers
Swimmers at the 2012 Summer Paralympics
Swimmers at the 2016 Summer Paralympics
Swimmers at the 2020 Summer Paralympics
Paralympic swimmers of Brazil
Medalists at the 2011 Parapan American Games
Medalists at the 2015 Parapan American Games
Medalists at the World Para Swimming Championships
S4-classified Paralympic swimmers
21st-century Brazilian people